António José Pinheiro de Carvalho (born 14 January 1993), known as Tozé, is a Portuguese professional footballer who plays for Emirati club Al-Nasr SC as a midfielder.

Club career
Born in Forjães, Esposende, Tozé had two youth spells with FC Porto, the latter starting in 2009 and leading to his graduation. He made his senior debut in the 2012–13 season, being a nuclear element for the B team in the Segunda Liga.

On 10 February 2013, shortly after celebrating his 20th birthday, Tozé made his first official appearance for the main squad, coming on as a second-half substitute for Silvestre Varela in a 1–1 home draw against S.C. Olhanense in the Primeira Liga. In the 2013–14 campaign, as the reserves came second in their league, he was runner-up in the scoring charts with one goal fewer than Jorge Pires' 22.

For 2014–15, Tozé was loaned to fellow top-flight club G.D. Estoril Praia. He scored a penalty against Porto to put his team 2–1 ahead in a league fixture on 9 November, in an eventual 2–2 home draw; right after the match, he was confronted in the stadium's tunnel by Porto staff members who accused him of lack of professionalism for scoring the penalty.

After leaving the Estádio do Dragão in the summer of 2015, Tozé signed a four-year deal with Vitória S.C. also of the Portuguese top tier. For 2017–18, he joined Moreirense F.C. in a season-long loan.

On 25 August 2018, both Tozé and André André contributed one goal each to help defeat their 3–2 former club Porto away after being down 2–0. The following June, having decided he would not renew his expiring contract with Vitória, he moved to the UAE Pro-League with Al-Nasr SC.

Tozé scored the winning goal in the final of the UAE League Cup against Shabab Al Ahli Club on 17 January 2020, helping his team win their second title in the competition.

Personal life
In 2011, Tozé was distinguished as the best student in all the public high-schools of Porto, receiving an award from mayor Rui Rio. He graduated from Escola António Nobre with a final maximum grade of 20, and subsequently studied veterinary medicine in the Abel Salazar Biomedical Sciences Institute, simultaneously with his football career.

Career statistics

Honours
Porto
Primeira Liga: 2012–13

Al-Nasr
UAE League Cup: 2019–20

References

External links

1993 births
Living people
People from Esposende
Sportspeople from Braga District
Portuguese footballers
Association football midfielders
Primeira Liga players
Liga Portugal 2 players
Padroense F.C. players
FC Porto B players
FC Porto players
G.D. Estoril Praia players
Vitória S.C. players
Vitória S.C. B players
Moreirense F.C. players
UAE Pro League players
Al-Nasr SC (Dubai) players
Portugal youth international footballers
Portugal under-21 international footballers
Portuguese expatriate footballers
Expatriate footballers in the United Arab Emirates
Portuguese expatriate sportspeople in the United Arab Emirates